Casasia acunae, is a species of flowering plant belonging to the family Rubiaceae.

References

acunae